He Named Me Malala is a 2015 American documentary film directed by Davis Guggenheim. The film presents the young Pakistani female activist and Nobel Peace Prize laureate Malala Yousafzai, who has spoken out for the rights of girls, especially the right to education, since she was very young. The film also recounts how she survived and has become even more eloquent in her quest after being hunted down and shot by a Taliban gunman as part of the organization's violent opposition to girls' education in the Swat Valley in Pakistan. The title refers to the Afghani folk hero Malalai of Maiwand, after whom her father named her.

On December 1, 2015, He Named Me Malala was shortlisted with fourteen other documentaries submitted to the 88th Academy Awards in the Best Documentary Feature category, but failed to gain the nomination. It was nominated at the 43rd Annie Awards in Best Animated Special Production category.

Production
Walter F. Parkes and Laurie MacDonald produced the film through Imagenation Abu Dhabi FZ along with Participant Media.

Release
Fox Searchlight Pictures acquired the US rights to the film on March 31, 2015, while StudioCanal would release the film in France.

The film premiered at the Telluride Film Festival on September 4, 2015, and received a theatrical release in the United States on October 2. On June 18, 2015, National Geographic announced they had acquired broadcasting rights to the film and will air the film in 171 countries in 45 languages. In Pakistan, Geo News broadcast the film, which was dubbed in Urdu language by family of Yousafzai.

He Named Me Malala was released on DVD on December 15, 2015.

Reception

Box office
He Named Me Malala opened theatrically in the United States on October 2, 2015 and earned $60,884 in its opening weekend, ranking number 43 in the United States box office. The following week the film expanded from 4 to 446 screens, earning an estimated $685,000. As of October 25, 2015, the film's domestic total stands at $1,978,146. The film began its international rollout on October 22 in Germany where it grossed $29,880 fin 71 screens for a 25th place spot. It opened Austria a day later, where it debuted with $4,765 from 11 screens. As of October 25, 2015, the film's domestic total stands at $1,978,146 and the international total is $34,644, giving the film a worldwide gross of $2,012,790.

Critical reception
The film received mixed to positive reviews from critics. On Rotten Tomatoes, the film has a rating of 71% based on 110 reviews, with an average rating of 6.6/10. The site's consensus reads, "He Named Me Malala spotlights a worthy subject, but without the focus her story deserves." On Metacritic, the film has a score of 61 out of 100, based on 25 critics, indicating "generally favorable reviews". Audiences surveyed by CinemaScore gave the film an average grade of "A" on an A+ to F scale.

Accolades
The film received two Women's Image Network Awards nominations, including Best Documentary and Best Producer. It was nominated at the 69th British Academy Film Awards for Best Documentary. It lost to Amy.

Soundtrack

The official soundtrack to the film, featuring original score composed by Thomas Newman, was released digitally on October 2, 2015 and physically on October 30, 2015 by Sony Classical. Additional tracks, that were not included on the official soundtrack, includes: "Happiness" (traditional) - performed by Form IV Class of Kisaruni Secondary School 2014, "I Am Many" - written by Alicia Keys and Thomas Newman and "Story to Tell" by Alicia Keys.

References

External links
 
 
 
 

Malala Yousafzai
2015 films
2015 documentary films
American documentary films
Emirati documentary films
Films about activists
Fox Searchlight Pictures films
Documentary films about child abuse
Documentary films about Pakistan
Documentary films about violence against women
Films directed by Davis Guggenheim
Violence against women in Pakistan
Films scored by Thomas Newman
Participant (company) films
Films produced by Walter F. Parkes
2010s feminist films
2010s English-language films
Primetime Emmy Award-winning broadcasts
2010s American films